Rodney Davis may refer to:

 Rodney M. Davis (1942–1967), U.S. Marine and Medal of Honor recipient
, named in his honor, launched in 1986
 Rodney Davis (politician) (born 1970), U.S Representative for Illinois's 13th congressional district

See also
Rod Davis (disambiguation)
Rodney Davies (disambiguation)